This article contains an alphabetical list of notable roads within Kuching, Sarawak, Malaysia.

==Roads==

References

Kuching